The 2012 AFC Futsal Club Championship was the 3rd AFC Futsal Club Championship. It was held in Kuwait City, Kuwait between July 1 and July 6, 2012.

On 21 November 2011 the AFC Futsal Committee, under the chairmanship of Guam's Richard Lai, proposed to award the hosting rights of the 2012 AFC Futsal Club Championship to Kuwait The draw for the tournament was held on 26 April 2012 in Movenpick Hotel, Kuwait City.

Qualification 

The national league champions of the three best placed teams in the 2011 Championship received a bye to the final as well as the host nation's champion. The remaining four spots were decided in two Asian qualifying tournaments.

Venues

Group stage

Group A

Group B

Knockout stage

Semi-finals

Third place play-off

Final

Awards 

 Most Valuable Player
 Mohammad Keshavarz
 Top Scorer
 Ahmad Esmaeilpour (9 goals)
 Fair-Play Award
 Nagoya Oceans
 All-Star Team
  Rustam Umarov (Ardus) (GK)
  Mohammad Keshavarz (Giti Pasand)
  Rafael Henmi (Nagoya Oceans)
  Ahmad Esmaeilpour (Giti Pasand)
  Kaoru Morioka (Nagoya Oceans)
 Reserve All-Star Team
  Alireza Samimi (Giti Pasand) (GK)
  Amro Mohssein (Al-Rayyan)
  Afshin Kazemi (Giti Pasand)
  Dilshod Irsaliev (Ardus)
  Khaled Takaji (All Sports)
 Coach:  Alireza Afzal (Giti Pasand)

Final standing

Top scorers

References

External links 
 Official site
 AFC Technical Report

 
AFC Futsal Club Championship seasons
Futsal
International futsal competitions hosted by Kuwait
Futsal